Ashton is a village in Hampshire, England. It consists of mainly substantial properties and is situated just inside the boundary for the South Downs National Park.

Local businesses include:
 Park Farm is renowned locally for its wonderful selection of fresh organic produce.  
 The White Horse has recently changed management and always has a couple of guest beers.

Governance
The village is part of the civil parish of Bishop's Waltham and is part of the Bishop's Waltham ward of the City of Winchester non-metropolitan district of Hampshire County Council.

References

External links

Villages in Hampshire
Bishop's Waltham